Brian Keith Corey (born 1963) is a United States Navy rear admiral who is the Program Executive Officer for Unmanned Air Systems and Strike Weapons of the Naval Air Systems Command since May 3, 2018. He was previously the Commander of the Naval Air Warfare Center Weapons Division from October 2015 to April 2018.

Raised in Granite City, Illinois, Corey graduated from Granite City North High School in 1981. He then attended the University of Illinois at Urbana–Champaign and earned a B.S. degree in chemical engineering. Corey later graduated from the Naval Test Pilot School and received a master's degree in national security and strategic studies from the Naval War College.

References

External links

1963 births
Living people
Place of birth missing (living people)
People from Granite City, Illinois
Grainger College of Engineering alumni
United States Naval Aviators
Recipients of the Air Medal
United States Naval Test Pilot School alumni
Naval War College alumni
Recipients of the Meritorious Service Medal (United States)
United States Navy admirals
Military personnel from Illinois